Rutley is a surname. Notable people with the surname include:

Brandon Rutley (born 1989), Canadian football running back
David Rutley (born 1961), UK Conservative politician, Member of Parliament for Macclesfield
Frank Rutley (1842–1904), an English geologist and petrographer
Fred Rutley (1902–1947), Australian rules footballer
Nick Rutley, Australian rules football coach
Peter Rutley (born 1946), English former professional footballer

See also
Knight, Frank & Rutley, UK estate agency founded in London by John Knight, Howard Frank and William Rutley in 1896
Routley